Belgium was represented by Nathalie Sorce with the song "Envie de vivre" at the 2000 Eurovision Song Contest, which took place in Stockholm on 13 May. Sorce was the winner of the Belgian national final for the contest, held in Brussels on 18 February.

French-language broadcaster RTBF was in charge of the selection of the Belgian entry for the 2000 Contest.

Before Eurovision

Finale Nationale Concours Eurovision de la Chanson 2000 
The final took place on 18 February 2000 at the RTBF Studio 6, hosted by Jean-Pierre Hautier. A public televote determined the winner, "Envie de vivre" performed by Nathalie Sorce. The results of the public televote were revealed by Belgium's six regions (four Walloon provinces with votes from Namur and Luxembourg being combined, a "Rest of Belgium" region covering the five Flemish provinces, and Brussels) and led to the victory of Sorce by a margin of over 3,500 votes.

Controversy 
After the final, there was initially some degree of uncertainty about the disproportionately high number of votes to Sabrina Klinkenberg from the province of Liège, but RTBF subsequently confirmed that it was correct, citing the fact that Klinkenberg was a native of that province as the most probable explanation, and pointing out that Sorce had also received an exceptionally high number of votes from her home province of Hainaut.

At Eurovision 
On the night of the final Sorce performed 10th in the running order, following Russia and preceding Cyprus. A somewhat shrill and at times off-key vocal performance, combined with a much-criticised choice of outfit, contributed towards an ignominious result, with only 2 points received and a last place finish of the 24 entrants, the eighth time that Belgium had finished at the foot of the Eurovision scoreboard. The 12 points from the Belgian televote were awarded to Latvia.

Voting

References

External links 
 Belgian Preselection 2000

2000
Countries in the Eurovision Song Contest 2000
Eurovision